Image Space Incorporated (ISI) is an American independent video game developer based in Ann Arbor, Michigan, specializing in the fields of video game development, man-in-the-loop simulator architectures, computer image generation, and entertainment systems integration.
ISI was originally founded by Kurt Kleinsorge who added partners Joseph Campana and Gjon Camaj. ISI began with the development of vehicle simulators used for military training. They have worked on many different types of software, but focused most of their development time over the years on racing games and simulators.
ISI also developed the ISImotor game engine, which is used for creating many racing games like GT Legends, GTR 2, ARCA Sim Racing '08, Race 07, and others. ISI has not released games for any console; Shadowgate Rising was in development, but ultimately cancelled. Sports Car GT for the PlayStation was made by another company Point of View and all the original EA Formula 1 games for consoles up until 2002 were made by Visual Science.

Games developed

References

External links
Image Space Incorporated
Image Space profile on MobyGames

Video game companies of the United States
Companies based in Ann Arbor, Michigan
Video game development companies
Image Space Incorporated games